Chet Picks on the Grammys is a compilation recording by American guitarist Chet Atkins. The 13 tracks are all recordings of songs that won Grammy awards from 1967 to 1996. The songs either won a Grammy individually or were included on an album that won.

Track listing
 "Tears" (Django Reinhardt, Stéphane Grappelli) – 2:46
 "Nut Sundae" (Jerry Reed Hubbard) – 2:39
 "Snowbird" (MacLellan) – 2:16
 "I'll See You in My Dreams" (Isham Jones, Gus Kahn) – 3:20
 "The Entertainer" (Scott Joplin) – 2:18
 "Caravan" (Duke Ellington, Irving Mills, Juan Tizol) – 3:18
 "Ready for the Times to Get Better" (Reynolds) – 4:09
 "Cosmic Square Dance" (Atkins, Mark Knopfler, Paul Yandell) – 4:17
 "So Soft, Your Goodbye" (Randy Goodrum) – 3:20
 "Poor Boy Blues" (Paul Kennerly) – 4:05
 "Sneakin' Around" (Kass) – 4:27
 "Young Thing" (Atkins) – 3:15
 "Jam Man" (Atkins) – 3:22

Personnel
Chet Atkins – guitar
Paulinho da Costa - Percussion

References

2002 compilation albums
Chet Atkins compilation albums
Columbia Records compilation albums